Keith Johnston(e) may refer to:

 Keith Johnstone (badminton), played in Australian National Badminton Championships
 Keith Johnstone (born 1933), playwright and director

See also 
 Keith Johnson (disambiguation)